Jason Harley Kloepfer, a 41-year-old man, was shot on December 13, 2022, by the Cherokee Indian Police SWAT Team at Kloepfer's home in Murphy, North Carolina, United States. Kloepfer survived and in January 2023 released surveillance video from inside his home that showed events that differed from the initial account of the shooting given by the Cherokee County Sheriff's Office, which claimed that Kloepfer engaged in a "verbal altercation with officers" and "confronted officers". The video showed that Kloepfer exited his house with his arms raised as per police's instructions, while he was holding onto a cigarette and a camera-equipped robot which police had thrown into his home; Kloepfer was shot around four seconds later, when his arms were still raised. Within hours of the shooting, Kloepfer was charged with communicating threats, as well as resist, obstruct and delay, but these charges were dropped by March 2023. The police's actions were investigated by the North Carolina State Bureau of Investigation.

Shooting 
911 call records showed that there were 13 calls from May 2020 to September 2022 related to Jason Harley Kloepfer's residence, with the records stating that the calls were regarding incidents including "welfare check", "assault", "disturbance" and "fireworks".

On December 12, 2022, just before 11.20 p.m., a person called 911, claiming to be Kloepfer's neighbor. The caller indicated that Kloepfer "about an hour ago, started shooting off fireworks, screaming, yelling, going to kill everyone in the neighborhood ... he's discharging a firearm ... They've been over there screaming, yelling and fighting for the last 45 minutes". The caller then said: "I just heard his wife screaming 'stop it,' and then a bunch of shots went off and now I can’t hear her over there at all." The caller then quotes his neighbor as saying: "Send the police, I'll get them too."

Around 11.20 p.m. on December 12, three Cherokee County deputies arrived at Kloepfer's home, and are heard saying: "We haven’t been able to make contact with anybody at this residence ... There's a detached garage with music blaring in the garage. We can’t get anybody to come to the door at the garage either." The officers referenced seeing a bullet and security cameras at Kloepfer's home. The SWAT team of the Eastern Band of the Cherokee Indian Police Department was summoned around 12.20 a.m. on December 13 to handle a potential hostage situation.  A search warrant for Kloepfer's home was approved around 2.15 a.m.

After the Cherokee Indian Police Department's SWAT Team arrived at Kloepfer's home, surveillance footage from the inside of Kloepfer's house, starting at 4.54 a.m. on December 13, showed police throwing a robot with a light and cameras into Kloepfer's home. The robot starts to shine a light around the home; two minutes later, a light is shone into Kloepfer's bedroom, and this appears to wake Kloepfer and his wife, who says: "What’s going on?" Both call out: "Hello?" A police officer says through a loudspeaker: "Jason ... Step outside ... Come outside, Jason ... Step outside the door onto the deck and show us your hands. Jason, we just want to talk to you. Come outside." While the officer is speaking, Kloepfer picks up the police's robot.

At 4.57 a.m. and 16 seconds, Kloepfer opens the door to his home, unarmed and with his hands in the air; he is holding a cigarette and the police's robot. Behind Kloepfer is his wife, whose hands are also in the air. Officers shout for Kloepfer to hold up his hands; at 4.57 a.m. and 20 seconds, Kloepfer is shot multiple times while he was holding up his hands. He fell to the floor, crying out: "I’m shot!" The police continued shooting even after Kloepfer had fallen to the floor.

Following the shooting, Kloepfer's wife yells at officers: "What the hell, he's shot, what the hell did you do?!" Officers order Kloepfer and his wife to leave the home. While Kloepfer's wife follows the officers' orders to leave the home, both she and Kloepfer protest that he cannot do that because of his bullet wounds. On the floor, Kloepfer drags himself towards the door, protesting: "I don’t have a gun! I didn’t have a gun!" He sticks his hands out of the door frame. At 4.58 a.m, officers enter Kloepfer's home and step over Kloepfer, who still has his hands up. After an initial check of the home, one officer at 4.59 a.m informs another officer to "start working on" Kloepfer. Kloepfer is removed from his home. Three officers re-enter the home at 5 a.m, one shouts: "Fuck bro, fuck", while another says: “Hey, cameras, cameras!"

Kloepfer was brought to a hospital and survived the shooting. He subsequently uploaded photos online showing bullet wounds at his chest, abdomen and arm.

Aftermath

Initial police press release and Kloepfer's charges 
At 11.42 a.m on December 13, the Cherokee County Sheriff's Office issued a press release stating that after a 911 call regarding multiple gunshots at a residence, police responded to the scene. The press release stated that deputies were "unsuccessful" in contacting the suspect, so the Cherokee County Sheriff’s Office obtained a search warrant, and called in the Cherokee Indian Police Department SWAT Team due to "an armed suspect present and the potential for a hostage situation".

The press release went on to say that the Cherokee Indian Police SWAT Team shot Kloepfer after Kloepfer "engaged in a verbal altercation with officers and emerged from a camper trailer and confronted officers". 

The press release stated that Kloepfer received two charges, the first being communicating threats, the second being resist, obstruct and delay, and that more charges were possible, according to the press release. Kloepfer was scheduled to appear in court on March 9. By March 1, the charges against Kloepfer had been dropped. According to the local district attorney's office, charge of making threats was dropped "at the request of the prosecuting witness", while the charge of resisting orders was dropped as "the charging document does not list the type of orders given and under what circumstances that this would be a duty of their office".

Kloepfer's release of surveillance footage 
WLOS reported in January 2023 that surveillance footage, published by Kloepfer, showing the inside of Kloepfer's house, "appears to show a conflicting account of the event" when compared to the Cherokee County Sheriff's Office's press release. The Cherokee Scout agrees that "key details" of the press release seem to be contradicted. RTL.hu reported that the surveillance footage showed Kloepfer obeying police commands, in contrast to the press release's claim that Kloepfer confronted police. Skai Group agreed that Kloepfer was shot despite appearing to have complied with police orders. The Independent reported that the surveillance footage did not show Kloepfer engaging in a "verbal altercation" or confronting police, as claimed in the press release.

Cherokee County Sheriff Dustin Smith later stated that the press release was published without him having personal knowledge of what had happened, and the press release "relied on information provided to us from the Cherokee Indian Police Department". However, Smoky Mountain News reported that multiple Cherokee County deputies and investigators were at the scene during the shooting. Smith also stated that the aim of the press release "was not to comment on the subsequent criminal investigation, which remains ongoing, but rather to update the public on a dangerous situation." Smith added that he did not see video of the shooting until January 18, 2023. Smith used the post to advocate for the creation for a SWAT team for Cherokee County.

Reactions 
On January 20, 2023, Kloepfer stated that he was "physically doing better", but he and his wife were mentally "not so good", "out of state for fear of our lives since I got out the hospital". He described the incident as a "horrible nightmare" and called his charges "completely wrong".

Video of the shooting received international attention. The surveillance footage has circulated online, including on YouTube, with one video receiving almost 100,000 views by the end of January 2023. Greek media outlet To Vima described the incident as another scandal of police brutality in the United States, and noted social media outrage over the police's use of force. Hungarian media outlet RTL.hu opined that Kloepfer's wife was lucky not to be shot in this incident. 

The North Carolina State Bureau of Investigation in December 2022 started an investigation into the shooting. The bureau does not make its investigation results public, but sends them to a district attorney, who will decide whether to file charges against any officers.

References

External links 

 Surveillance video of the shooting: Shooting of Jason Harley Kloepfer – December 13, 2022 on YouTube

 Press release on December 13, 2022  by the Cherokee County Sheriff's Office on Facebook

 Press release on January 20, 2023  by the Cherokee County Sheriff's Office on Facebook

2022 in North Carolina
2022 controversies in the United States
December 2022 events in the United States
Law enforcement controversies in the United States